The Canadian Soccer League is a Canadian professional league for soccer clubs primarily located in the province of Ontario. It is a Non-FIFA league previously sanctioned by the Canadian Soccer Association (CSA) and is now a member of the Soccer Federation of Canada (SFC). As of 2022, it consists of six teams all located in Ontario. Each year, the league uses a playoff format to determine the overall champion. From 2002 until 2009 the league also operated an Eastern and Western Conference followed by an International and National Division.

Thirteen clubs have won the CSL Championship: Toronto Croatia (6 times), York Region Shooters (3), St. Catharines Wolves (2), Serbian White Eagles (2), FC Continentals (2), Scarborough SC (2), Brampton Hitmen, Brantford Galaxy, Oakville Blue Devils, Ottawa Wizards, SC Waterloo Region, Toronto Olympians, and Trois-Rivieres Attak. The highest-ranked CSL Golden Boot goalscorer is Gus Kouzmanis with 33 goals during the league's inaugural season. Kouzmanis has also won the award the most times (2) during the 1998, and 2000 seasons. Trinidadian Kevin Nelson was the first foreigner to win the award in 2001.

Seasons

References